Gustav Dietrich Dahrendorf (8 January 1901, Hamburg – 30 October 1954) was a German SPD politician.

Biography
Dahrendorf was born in Hamburg, he served as member of the German Parliament from November 1932 to 22 June 1933. He was also several times a member of the Hamburg Parliament. He was the father of Ralf Dahrendorf, Baron Dahrendorf and Frank Dahrendorf.

In 1944 Dahrendorf was accused of treason at the Volksgerichtshof for his involvement in the 20 July plot alongside Julius Leber, Adolf Reichwein and Hermann Maaß. He was sentenced to 7 years imprisonment.

Dahrendorf died in Braunlage.

References

External links
 

1901 births
1954 deaths
Members of the Hamburg Parliament
Social Democratic Party of Germany politicians
German cooperative organizers
Members of the Reichstag of the Weimar Republic
Reichsbanner Schwarz-Rot-Gold members
Members of the Kreisau Circle
Commanders Crosses of the Order of Merit of the Federal Republic of Germany
Members of the 20 July plot
People convicted of treason against Germany